According to the Dictionary of American Family Names, "Serafini" is a plural form of the surname "Serafino", which itself is an Italian given name.  According to one website, the surname's origin dates to 400 B.C.  There has been a suggestion that "Serafini" was a baptismal name rather than a surname in at least some cases in the 17th century.
Serafini may refer to:

 Amadeus Serafini (born 1990), American actor
 Andrew A. Serafini (born 1962), American politician from Maryland
 Anunciado Serafini (1898–1963), Argentine Roman Catholic Bishop
 Camillo Serafini (died 1952), Italian Marquis and Governor of Vatican City
 Cristina Serafini (born 1978), Italian actress
 Dan Serafini (born 1974), left-handed Major League Baseball relief pitcher
 Dom Serafini (born 1949), Italian journalist and author, based in New York City
 Domenico Serafini (1852–1918), Italian cardinal
 Dorino Serafini (1909–2000), motorcycle road racer and racing driver
 Francesco Serafini (born 1990), Italian football midfielder
 Frank Serafini (born 1945), former Republican member of the Pennsylvania House of Representatives
 Giovanni Serafini (1786–1855), Italian cardinal
 Giulio Serafini (1867–1938), Italian cardinal
 Joe Serafini (born 1998), American actor
 Laurie Serafini (born 1958), former Australian rules footballer
 Luigi Serafini (artist) (born 1949), Italian artist, architect and designer
 Luigi Serafini (basketball) (born 1951), Italian basketball player
Luigi Serafini (cardinal) (1808–1894), Italian Roman Catholic cardinal
 Matteo Serafini (born 1978), Italian football player
 Mattia Serafini (born 1983), Italian footballer
 Palmiro Serafini (born 1945), Italian ski mountaineer and former cross-country skier
 Renato Serafini (born 1953), former Australian rules footballer
 Ron Serafini (born 1953), retired professional ice hockey player
 Sebastiano Serafini (born 1990), Italian actor, model, musician and stylist
 Serafino de' Serafini, Italian painter
 Thaisa Serafini (born 1985), Brazilian professional squash player

Fictional characters 
 Angelo Serafini, birthname of David Chow fictional character from the CBS soap opera The Young and the Restless

References